Artificial City is a South Korean television series directed by Jeon Chang-geun and starring Soo Ae, Kim Mi-sook, Kim Kang-woo and Lee Hak-joo. This psychological series is about a society whose characters have different desires and psychology, which pushes them to conceal their dark sides. It premiered on JTBC on December 8, 2021 and aired every Wednesday and Thursday at 22:30 (KST).

Synopsis
A psychological mystery thriller that tells the story of things which lose their meaning when greed and power comes into play. A big conglomerate, Sungjin Group, which has clout over political and financial circles in South Korea, owns an art museum called “Space Jin”. Yoon Jae-hee (Soo Ae), second daughter-in-law of the family, is in-charge of the art museum. She hates poverty so she ditched her long-time lover and married Jung Joon-hyuk (Kim Kang-woo), an illegitimate son of Sungjin Group. She even fights her in-laws in order to make her husband the country's President, with the help of the future Public Prosecutor General. The husband poses as if he has no such ambition, but inside he waits for the day when he can have the control.

Cast and characters

Main
 Soo Ae as Yoon Jae-hee
The second daughter-in-law of Sungjin Group, in-charge of 'Space Jin' art museum.
 Kim Kang-woo as Jung Joon-hyuk
Husband of Yoon Jae-hee, illegitimate son of Sungjin Group and JBC's popular anchorman.
 Kim Mi-sook as Seo Han-sook
Jung Joon-hyuk's step-mother and Chairman of the Sungjin Cultural Foundation.
 Lee Yi-dam as Kim Yi-seol
Docent of 'Space Jin'.
 Lee Hak-joo as Han Dong-min
JBC news reporter.

Supporting

People around Sungjin Group
 Song Young-chang as Jung Pil-sung, calligrapher, Seo Han-sook's husband and Jun-hyeok's father.
 Kim Young-jae as Jung Joon-il, Vice Chairman of Sungjin Electronics and Seo Han-sook's son.
 Kim Ji-hyun as Lee Joo-yeon, Jung Joon-il's wife and representative of 'Space Jin'.
 Lee Seo-an as Jung Eun-jung, the youngest daughter of the Sungjin Group and an aspiring playwright.
 Kim Joo-ryoung as Go Seon-mi, Seo Han-sook's secretary.
 Jung Hee-tae as Yang Won-rok, Phil's younger brother and President of Myeongseong Construction, a demolition service company.
 Seo Woo-jin as Jung Hyun-woo, son of Jae-hee and Joon-hyuk.

People from outside
 Lee Choong-joo as Park Jeong-ho, a prosecutor at the Central District Prosecutor's Office.
 Jeong Hae-kyun as Jo Kang-hyun, Minister of Justice.
 Baek Ji-won as Kwon Min-sun, Jo Kang-hyun's wife.
 Seo Jae-hee as Oh Ye-rin, Jo Kang-hyun's girlfriend.
 Nam Gi-ae as Min Ji-young, Seo Young-ho's wife and Min Seong-sik's younger sister.
 Park Ji-il as Min Seong-sik, Min Ji-young's older brother.
 Nam Moon-cheol as Choi Hee-joong, Editor-in-Chief of 'Daily News'.
 Yeom Dong-heon as Kwak Ki-hwan, Former Police Commissioner, re-elected member of the National Police Agency.
 Yoo Jin-seok as Former Minister of Culture, Sports and Tourism.

Others
 Nam Myeong-ryeol as Yoon Jong-pil, Jae-hee's father and a former judge.
 Lee Kyu-Hyun as Park Yong-seop, a waiter.
 Park Myung-shin as Kim Myung-wan, a restaurant manager, she lives in the same neighborhood as Kim Yi-seol and takes care of her.
 Hwang Seon-hee as Noh Young-joo, entertainment worker.

Special appearance
Kim Hyun-soo as Do Eun-young

Production
In December 2020, Studio Santa Claus Entertainment, Soo Ae's agency, announced that she was offered a role in Artificial City. This would be her first drama since the 2016 series Sweet Stranger and Me. On 6 January 2021, King Entertainment announced that Kim Kang-woo was offered the leading role for the series. His last appearance was in Woman of 9.9 Billion in 2019. This is the second common project for Kim Kang-woo and Soo Ae, who had previously worked together in the 2018 film High Society and attends to 2007 Busan's International Film Festival.

Principal photography was wrapped up on 29 March 2021.

The first script reading photos were revealed on November 3, 2021.

Original soundtrack

Part 1

Part 2

Part 3

Viewership

References

External links
  
 Artificial City at Naver  
Artificial City at JTBC Studios 
 Artificial City at Daum 
 
 

JTBC television dramas
Korean-language television shows
2021 South Korean television series debuts
2022 South Korean television series endings
Television series by JTBC Studios
South Korean mystery television series